Robert William Jencks (July 15, 1941 – September 6, 2010)  was an American football kicker and end in the National Football League (NFL) for the Chicago Bears and the Washington Redskins.  He played college football at Miami University and was drafted in the second round of the 1963 NFL Draft.  Jencks was also selected in the fifth round of the 1963 AFL Draft by the Buffalo Bills.  His rookie season was 1963, when the Bears defeated the New York Giants for the team's first NFL title since 1946.

Jencks was born in Columbus, Ohio and died in Manchester, New Hampshire, where he had lived for many years.

References

1941 births
2010 deaths
American football ends
American football placekickers
Chicago Bears players
Miami RedHawks football players
Washington Redskins players
People from Upper Arlington, Ohio
Players of American football from Columbus, Ohio